Jihad Al-Zoghbi is a Syrian actor and voice actor.

Filmography

Film

Television

Dubbing roles
Dinosaur - Kron
Over the Garden Wall - Narrator

References

External links

Living people
Syrian male actors
Syrian male voice actors
21st-century Syrian male actors
Syrian male television actors
Year of birth missing (living people)